Dil Diya Hai is a 2006 Indian Hindi-language romantic thriller film directed by Aditya Datt. It stars Emraan Hashmi, Ashmit Patel, Geeta Basra and Mithun Chakraborty. The music is given by Himesh Reshammiya.

Plot 
The story is about a girl who is sold into prostitution by the protagonist whom she loves, or so thinks she does, but after she is rescued by the same man who sold her into prostitution, she forgives him and falls in love with him again with no consequences to the protagonist. The justification for joining the prostitution ring is to make money for his moms lung transplant.

Cast

Emraan Hashmi as Sahil Khanna
Geeta Basra as Neha Mehra
Mithun Chakraborty as Rony
Kitu Gidwani as Michelle
Ranjeet as Mallik
Ashmit Patel as Kunal Malik
Markus Schief as Police Officer
Michael Sani as Head of Security
Paresh Ganatra as Patel
Udita Goswami Special appearance in song 'Jabse Aankh Ladi'
Sandeep Mehta as Neha's Father
Ananya Sharma as Neha's Mother
Rashmi Patel as  Mrs Khanna (Sahil's mother)
 Gayatri Rawal as Vidya

Soundtrack
The movie has six songs composed by Himesh Reshammiya and written by Sameer.

  "Afsana": Himesh Reshammiya and Tulsi Kumar
  "Dil Diya": Himesh Reshammiya and Himani Kapoor
  "Yaadaan Teriyaan": Himesh Reshammiya
  "Mile Ho Tum": Himesh Reshammiya and Tulsi Kumar
  "Jabse Aankh Ladi": Jayesh Gandhi and Alisha Chinoy
  "Chalo Dildaar Chalo": Vinit Singh, Himani Kapoor and Hemachandra

The soundtrack also features a remix version of every song. The remixes were rendered by DJ Akbar Sami.

References

External links
 

2006 films
2006 thriller drama films
2000s Hindi-language films
Indian thriller drama films
Films shot in London
Films scored by Himesh Reshammiya